Devilert Arsene Kimbembe (born 1984 in Brazzaville) is a Congolese sprinter. He competed in the Men's 100m event at the 2012 Summer Olympics where he qualified in the preliminaries with a seasonal best time of 10.68 but was eliminated in the first round.

References

Living people
1984 births
Sportspeople from Brazzaville
Republic of the Congo male sprinters
Olympic athletes of the Republic of the Congo
Athletes (track and field) at the 2012 Summer Olympics
World Athletics Championships athletes for the Republic of the Congo